Andreaea gainii is a species of moss native to western Antarctica and the South Shetland Islands. It grows on exposed rocks and soil.

References

Andreaeaceae
Flora of Antarctica